Eupithecia graciliata is a moth in the family Geometridae. It is found in the nation of Georgia.

References

Moths described in 1906
graciliata
Moths of Europe
Moths of Asia